Ciclos is the fourth album of the Costa Rican music group Gandhi. Some of its singles are "Señor Caballero", "Ciclos", "Una Ilusion" and "Celeste"

Track listing
"Ciclos"
"Señor Caballero" (English: Mr. Gentleman or Sir Gentleman [Don't confuse with Mr. Horseman])
"Celeste"
"Sombras"
"Puente"
"Vacío" ( or The empty)
"Despierta" (Wake up! or (It) Wakes Up)
"Una ilusión"
"40"
"Aire"
"El sol y la flor"

"Un Ciclo Más"

"Un Ciclo Más" is a DVD by Gandhi based on their last album, "Ciclos". It includes their videos and live performances.

Gandhi (Costa Rican band) albums
2004 albums